The 1912–13 season was the first in the history of the Athenian League, an English football competition.

Catford Southend emerged as champions. Barking resigned after 2 matches, with their record being expunged.

League table

References 

Athenian League
I